Graham Oakey (born 5 October 1954) is an English former footballer who made 88 Football League appearances for Coventry City.

Oakey was a product of Coventry's youth development system. He made his league debut in a home 2-2 draw against Manchester City in September 1974. His career was cut short by a knee injury sustained at Villa Park in December 1977.

References 

Coventry Evening Telegraph Editions 1974 - 1978

1954 births
Coventry City F.C. players
Living people
People from Droitwich Spa
Association football fullbacks
English Football League players
Worcester City F.C. players
English footballers
Sportspeople from Worcestershire